

Regular Football League First team

Number of League games in which this eleven was fielded = 0

Other members of the first team squad

Everton were expected to be serious title contenders in the 1892–93 season but a summer of off the field turmoil played a part in a good but not great season. The club were forced to vacate their Anfield Road home and set up at a brand new venue of Goodison Park, leaving behind them their first choice left back, Duncan McLean and forward Alan Wylie. The latter probably realised that the return from injury of Fred Geary would see him left out of the front line but McLean's decision was a surprise to the club and fans and Bob Howarth found himself with six full back partners during the season. For the second year in a row the club struggled to find a first choice keeper as six different custodians filled that role as well, including Joey Murray on three occasions, despite his normal position being as a forward. The indecision in goal was more down to the selectors than poor performance as each defeat the club suffered in the first half of the campaign was met with the keeper being dropped. Eventually the selectors settled for Richard Williams whose regular clean sheets in the latter half of the season saw the club rally to finish the season in third place and reach the cup final.

Everton's midfield trio was also broken up this season as Bob Kelso lost his place to Dickie Boyle who arrived from Dumbarton. The clubs erratic start also saw Hope Robertson replaced eight games in by Jimmy Jamieson. The Scottish left half's stay at Goodison was short and after just four months he left for Sheffield Wednesday.

With Sunderland marching to the title and Everton having to settle for a distant third place, albeit after an excellent run in which saw them win nine of their last ten games it was the F A cup that captured the excitement as the club won through to the final for the first time. The selectors famously fielded a weakened side for the trip to Wolverhampton Wanderers in a league game a week before the two sides met in the cup final and won 4–2. Only four of that team appeared the following week at the cup final as Boyle and Latta were joined by Kelso, having re-established himself in defence ahead of Collins and Stewart who had taken over after Jamieson had left for Sheffield Wednesday the previous month. The major selection surprise was that Patrick Gordon was selected ahead of Fred Geary in attack. The game became farce when the fans encroached onto the woefully inadequate field at Fallowfield in Manchester and made it impossible for Latta and Milward to use their wing play to proper effect, the latter being physically tripped by a spectator on one occasion. Wolves won the game in the second half when Harry Allen's hopeful punt deceived Dick Williams who lost the ball in the sun. Everton were furious though that Allen had received the ball from a spectator who had kicked the ball of Dickie Boyle's toe as the Everton half was taking the ball away from danger and felt that the game should have been reduced to the level of a friendly with the cup being played for at a later date. The game would leave a bad taste in the mouths of every Evertonian for over a decade until they finally did win the cup in 1906.

The Football League

Football Association Challenge Cup

Football League First Division

Records
The following positive or neutral records were set by the 1891–92 Everton team
Most points in a season = 36
Most home points in a season = 21
Most away points in a season = 15
Most wins in a season = 16
Equalled most home wins in a season = 9 matched 1890–91 team
Most home draws in a season = 3
Most goals scored in a season = 74
Most home goals scored in a season = 44
Most away goals scored in a season = 30
Biggest away win in league history 6–1 @ Derby County 5 November 1892
Equalled most goals in a single game = 4 Alex Latta, vs Newton Heath, 19 October 1892
Most hat tricks by team in a season = 3
Equalled Most season hat tricks = 2 Alex Latta matched his own 1892 record
Most Everton Hat tricks career = 5 Alex Latta (added two this season)
Longest winning sequence in club history = 8 from 14 January to 3 April 1893
Longest home winning sequence in club history = 6 from 7 January to season's end
Longest unbeaten run in club history = 8 from 14 January to 3 April
Equalled longest unbeaten home run in club history = 6 from 7 January to season's end matching 1889–90 team and 1890–91 team
Equalled longest home drawn sequence = 2 matching 1889–90 team
Equalled fewest away draw in a season = 1 matching 1889–90 and 1890–91 teams

The following negative records were also set by the team
Equalled most home defeats in a season = 3 matching with 1888–89 team and 1891–92 team
Most goals conceded in a season = 51
Equalled most home goals conceded in a season = 17 matching 1888–89 team
Most away goals conceded in a season = 34
First season in history without an ever present player
Longest winless home sequence in a season = 4

References

https://web.archive.org/web/20080820134110/http://www.allfootballers.co.uk/
http://www.Evertonfc.com

1892-93
English football clubs 1892–93 season